Gorilla vs. Bear is an MP3 blog for independent music MP3s, videos, news, and reviews from all genres. It was created by Chris Cantalini in March 2005, and David Bartholow joined as a contributor in 2006. Gorilla vs. Bear regularly features unknown, established, and independent unsigned artists. The blog is also known for its use of Polaroid film and Holga cameras for artist portraiture and live music coverage. It has received a number of accolades.

History 
In 2006, Sirius Satellite Radio selected Gorilla vs. Bear as one of their hosts of "Blog Radio," a weekly radio program on the college/indie rock channel Left of Center. Currently, it is available on the channel Sirius XMU.

Since the 2010 South By Southwest music festival, Gorilla vs. Bear has curated a small showcase entitled Gorilla vs. Booze.

Awards 
2007: "mp3 Blog of the Year" by The Morning News.
2008: One of the web's "Best Music Blogs", "Best in Rock" issue, Rolling Stone.
2008: "Best Music Blog" of 2008 by URB.
2009: One of "25 Best Music Websites" by The Independent.
2011: Nominated for Best Independent Music Blog, MTV O Music Awards (OMA).

References

External links 

 Gorilla vs. Bear Polaroids

Music blogs
American music websites